The Deaflympics also known as Deaflympiad (previously called World Games for the Deaf, and International Games for the Deaf) are a periodic series of multi-sport events sanctioned by the International Olympic Committee (IOC) at which Deaf athletes compete at an elite level. Unlike the athletes in other IOC-sanctioned events (the Olympics, the Paralympics, and the Special Olympics), athletes cannot be guided by sounds (such as starting pistols, bullhorn commands or referee whistles). The games have been organized by the Comité International des Sports des Sourds (CISS, "The International Committee of Sports for the Deaf") since the first event in 1924.

History 
The Deaflympics are held every four years, and are the longest running multi-sport event in history after the Olympics. The first games, held in Paris in 1924, were the first ever international sporting event for athletes with a disability. The event has been held every four years since, apart from a break for World War II, and an additional event, the Deaflympic Winter Games, was added in 1949. The games began as a small gathering of 148 athletes from nine European nations competing in the International Silent Games in Paris, France, in 1924; now, they have grown into a global movement.

Officially, the games were originally called the "International Games for the Deaf" from 1924 to 1965, but were sometimes also referred to as the "International Silent Games". From 1966 to 1999 they were called the "World Games for the Deaf", and occasionally referred to as the "World Silent Games". From 2001, the games have been known by their current name Deaflympics (often mistakenly called the Deaf Olympics).

To qualify for the games, athletes must have a hearing loss of at least 55 dB in their "better ear". Hearing aids, cochlear implants and the like are not allowed to be used in competition, to place all athletes on the same level. Other examples of ways the games vary from hearing competitions are the manner in which they are officiated. To address the issue of Deaflympians not being able to be guided by sounds, certain sports use alternative methods of commencing the game. For example, the football referees wave a flag instead of blowing a whistle; on the track, races are started by using a light, instead of a starter pistol. It is also customary for spectators not to cheer or clap, but rather to wave with both hands, the Deaf form of applause.

After the 2022 Russian invasion of Ukraine, the International Committee of Sports for the Deaf (ICSD) banned athletes from Russia and Belarus from that year's Deaflympics in Caxias do Sul, Brazil.

Host nations and cities 
To date, the Summer Deaflympic Games have been hosted by 22 cities in 18 countries, but by cities outside Europe on only six occasions (Washington, D.C. 1965, Los Angeles 1985, Christchurch 1989, Melbourne 2005, Taipei 2009 and Caxias do Sul in 2022). The last summer games were held in Samsun, Turkey in 2017. The Winter Deaflympic Games have been hosted by 16 cities in 11 countries. The last winter games were held in Sondrio Province, Italy in 2019. The next summer games are scheduled to be in Caxias do Sul, Brazil between 1 May to 15 May 2022 and in Kuala Lumpur, Malaysia between 20 and 30 October 2022.

The 2011 Winter Games scheduled to be held in Vysoké Tatry, Slovakia were cancelled due to the lack of readiness by the organizing committee to host the games. The International Committee of Deaf Sports filed a criminal complaint against the Slovak Deaflympics Organizing Committee and its president, Mr. Jaromír Ruda. The criminal complaint demands reimbursement of the funds that were transferred to the Slovak Deaflympics Organizing Committee from national deaf sports federations, to cover hotel accommodations and other Deaflympics-related expenses. According to the Slovak newspaper, SME, "Jaromír Ruda, head of the Slovak Organising Committee, [is] a champion of promises and someone who is accused of a 1.6 million Euro Deaflympics-related fraud". In a letter to the United States Deaflympians, International Committee of Sports for the Deaf ICSD President Craig Crowley expressed "his deep apologies for the cancellation of the 17th Winter Deaflympics". Currently, the Slovak Deaflympic Committee and the Slovakia Association of Deaf Sportsmen Unions have been suspended. In 2013 the Special Criminal Court in Banská Bystrica sentenced Ruda to a prison term of  years for defrauding €1.6 million that should have been used for Winter Deaflympics.

The host cities and National Deaf Sports Associations for all past and scheduled games are as follows:

List of Summer Deaflympics hosts

1 The Republic of China (Taiwan) is recognised as Chinese Taipei by CISS and the majority of international organisations it participates in due to political considerations and Cross-Strait relations with the People's Republic of China.

2 The marathon had been held 4 days before the opening ceremonies in Füssen, Germany on 21 July 2013.

3 Due the small number of venues near Caxias do Sul and Brazil,the bowling events were transferred to Kuala Lumpur, Malaysia and are scheduled to be between 20 and 30 October 2022.

List of Winter Deaflympics hosts

All-time medal table

Summer Deaflympics
An all-time Summer Deaflympics from 1924 Summer Deaflympics to 2021 Summer Deaflympics, is tabulated below. The table is simply the consequence of the sum of the medal tables of the various editions of the Summer Deaflympics.

Winter Deaflympics
An all-time Winter Deaflympics from 1949 Winter Deaflympics to 2019 Winter Deaflympics, is tabulated below. The table is simply the consequence of the sum of the medal tables of the various editions of the Winter Deaflympics.

Combined

Sports

Summer Deaflympics
The following sports have been contested in a Summer Deaflympic Games programme:

Winter Deaflympics
The following sports have been contested in a Winter Deaflympic Games programme:

See also

Disabled sports

References

External links 

 Comité International des Sports des Sourds official website

 
Deaf sports competitions
Disabled multi-sport events
Recurring sporting events established in 1924